Keilor Plains railway station is located on the Sunbury line in Victoria, Australia. It serves the western Melbourne suburb of St Albans, and opened on 27 January 2002.

History
Keilor Plains station opened on 27 January 2002, as part of the extension of the electrified network from St Albans to Sydenham.

In 1986, boom barriers were installed at the former Taylors Road level crossing, which was located at the down end of the station. In 1994, a rail-road roundabout was provided at the level crossing. In April 2007, construction commenced on a grade separation project, which involved lowering the road underneath the railway line. By September 2008, the level crossing was abolished and the project completed.

Platforms and services
Keilor Plains has two side platforms. It is served by Sunbury line trains.

Platform 1:
  all stations and limited stops services to Flinders Street

Platform 2:
  all stations services to Watergardens and Sunbury

By late 2025, it is planned that trains on the Sunbury line will be through-routed with those on the Pakenham and Cranbourne lines, via the new Metro Tunnel.

Transport links
CDC Melbourne operates two routes via Keilor Plains station, under contract to Public Transport Victoria:
 : St Albans station – Caroline Springs Square Shopping Centre
 : St Albans station – Watergardens station

References

External links
 Melway map at street-directory.com.au

Railway stations in Melbourne
Railway stations in Australia opened in 2002
Railway stations in the City of Brimbank